AH-1 or variant may refer to:

Minor planets
 1981 AH1, or 2684 Douglas
 1983 AH1, or 4783 Wasson
 1991 AH1, or 8166 Buczynski
 1994 AH1, or 7257 Yoshiya
 1996 AH1, or 37699 Santini-Aichl
 2002 AH1, or 95008 Ivanobertini

Vehicles
 Bell Huey derived attack helicopters:
 Bell AH-1 Cobra, single engine attack helicopter
 Bell AH-1 SuperCobra, dual engine attack helicopter
 Bell 309 KingCobra, attack helicopter
 , a hospital ship

Other uses
 AH1, longest route of the Asian Highway Network